Peter Tertzakian (born 1961) is an economist and author. He is the deputy director of the ARC Energy Research Institute, a managing director of energy-focused private equity firm ARC Financial Corporation, and the creator of Energyphile, a multimedia project on energy. His books examine economic, environmental and geopolitical pressures on the transformation of the global energy sector.

Education and qualifications
Tertzakian has an undergraduate degree in Geophysics from the University of Alberta, and a graduate degree in Econometrics from the University of Southampton, U.K. He also holds a Master of Science in Management of Technology from the MIT Sloan School of Management. Tertzakian is an Adjunct Professor with the Haskayne School of Business at the University of Calgary.

Career

Tertzakian has written two bestsellers — A Thousand Barrels a Second and The End of Energy Obesity — and in 2020 launched his new project, energyphile.org, and book, The Investor Visit and Other Stories: Disruption, Denial and Transition in the Energy Business.

In 2015 Tertzakian was seconded to the four-person Royalty Review Panel for the province of Alberta — the world’s eighth largest producer of oil and gas — where he led the redesign of the fiscal policy. In 2016 he was inducted into the Alberta Petroleum Hall of Fame and in 2021, he joined the Institute of Sustainable Finance Advisory Board and became the Chair of the board of Contemporary Calgary Art Gallery.

Published works
 [https://www.amazon.com/Investor-Visit-Other-Stories-Disruption/dp/1999111303/ The Investor Visit and Other Stories: Disruption, Denial and Transition in the Energy Business] (2020). ; .
 A Thousand Barrels a Second: The Coming Oil Break Point and the Challenges Facing an Energy Dependent World (2006). ; .
 The End of Energy Obesity: Breaking Today's Energy Addiction for a Prosperous and Secure Tomorrow (2009). ; .

References

External links
 Official website for Peter Tertzakian's Energyphile
 

Living people
Writers from Calgary
Writers from Saskatoon
University of Alberta alumni
Alumni of the University of Southampton
MIT Sloan School of Management alumni
Canadian political writers
Canadian columnists
Non-fiction environmental writers
People in the petroleum industry
Canadian geophysicists
Canadian people of Armenian descent
Energy economists
1961 births